The Asia Pacific Screen Award Jury Grand Prize is presented at the discretion of the jury. The winners of this award are

References

External links
Official Website

Asia Pacific Screen Awards
Awards for best film
Lists of films by award